Wemale is an Austronesian language spoken on western Seram Island in Indonesia. It is classified by Collins (1983) as a member of the Central Maluku subgroup.

The language is divided into northern and southern dialects, having variants known as Honitetu, Oemale, and Tala. Northern Wemale is spoken by about 5,000 people, whereas Southern Wemale is spoken by about 3,700 people.

See also
Wemale people
Hainuwele

References

Sources
Consolidation of Wemale at SIL

Central Maluku languages
Languages of Indonesia
Seram Island